A Jazzman's Blues is a 2022 American drama film written, produced and directed by Tyler Perry. The film stars Joshua Boone, Amirah Vann, Solea Pfeiffer, Austin Scott, Brent Antonello, and Ryan Eggold.

A Jazzman's Blues premiered at the Toronto International Film Festival on September 11, 2022, and was released on September 23, 2022, by Netflix.

Plot
In 1987, an elderly lady, Hattie Mae, visits Johnathan Dupree, the current Attorney General of Hopewell, Georgia, who is seeking re-election through his racist political ideologies. Hattie asks him to solve the 40 year old murder of her son, Horace John Boyd, known as Bayou, who was lynched in Hopewell County in 1947. She hands Johnathan a collection of letters and tells him all he needs to know he can find in them. He is about to throw them away when he notices the letters are addressed to a Leanne J. Harper.

Bayou comes from a family of musicians. His mother, Hattie Mae, is a talented blues singer and his father, Buster, a skilled guitarist. Bayou's older brother, and his father's favorite son, Willie Earl is a natural jazz trumpeter, while Bayou, although a gifted singer, is discouraged from displaying his talent by his abusive father who constantly picks on him and calls him weak and slow. One day while performing, Buster puts Bayou on the spot and says he has two boys, "one of them is just like me and one of them is not. Now, let's see which one it is." He calls Bayou over to play the trumpet, but to Bayou's embarrassment, he can't play a note.  Buster then calls over Willie Earl who skillfully and to the delight of the crowd, effortlessly solos to the song, "If You See My Rooster." Later, Bayou is seen skipping stones down by the river, where he is overheard singing by Leanne. Leanne Jean Harper is an educated but outcast girl, whom the townsfolk call Bucket, because of the way her mother dropped her off and skipped town to go north. Bayou is instantly infatuated with Bucket, who demands that she be called by her name Leanne Jean Harper, which Bayou mispronounces, "Lil Ann."

Bayou decides to ask Leanne to the town social but discovers her grandfather is very mean and overprotective of her and he threatens to kill Bayou if he ever catches him on his land again. That night, Leanne writes Bayou a note and folds it into an airplane and flies it through Bayou's open bedroom window. Bayou sneaks out and chases Leanne down to the yew tree. Leanne discovers Bayou can't read and volunteers to teach him how to read. They have secret meetings at night, but they are unable to be together publicly due to the disapproval of her grandfather who also sexually abuses her. The two fall in love. 

Buster and Hattie Mae get into a fight and Buster takes all of Hattie's money and abandons the family saying he is going to Chicago to make it big as a musician. Willie Earl resents being left behind and blames his father's running off on Bayou.  Soon after, Willie Earl turns 19 and decides to run off to Chicago to find his father and join his band. Meanwhile, Leanne abruptly stops her nightly visits. When Bayou goes to investigate, he sees Leanne's grandfather raping her, but is too afraid to intervene. Bayou asks Leanne to marry him and run away from her grandfather to Hopewell. They become separated after Leanne's grandfather sends for her mother, Ethel. Her mother forces her to move to Boston. Bayou writes to Leanne, but her mother intercepts the letter and instructs the mailman to return to sender all letters from Bayou's address. Bayou gets drafted into the army, but continues to write Leanne. While in the army, Hattie Mae and Citsy move to Hopewell County, Georgia to make a better life for themselves. 

It's 1947 and Hattie Mae opens up a successful juke joint where she performs nightly and she also makes a living as a laundress during the day. Citsy works as the maid for the local sheriff, Sheriff Jackson. Bayou is injured while serving in the army and gets discharged and comes back home to work for his mother. One night, Willie Earl shows up in the juke joint with a German man named Ira, the two of them both showing signs of drug intoxication. Ira, Willie Earl's manager, is close to overdosing and dying, passes out, but is nursed back to health by Hattie Mae and Bayou. Willie Earl tells his mother that Ira promised to get him an audition in Chicago. Ira hears Bayou sing in his mother's juke joint and realizes he more talented than his brother Willie Earl and plans to have Bayou audition in Chicago too.

Bayou and Leanne encounter each other again in 1947 after Leanne moves to Hopewell with her new husband and mother from Boston. Leanne is married to politician John, the brother of Sheriff Jackson, and is forced by her mother to pass as white for financial stability. The two reconnect and rekindle their love in secret. When Leanne's mother catches them having sex in Leanne's car, she lies to Sheriff Jackson, claiming that Bayou had whistled at Leanne. Citsy overhears Ethel's lie and races to tell Bayou, who barely escapes with Willie Earl and Ira who were headed out of town for Willie Earl's audition at the Capitol Royale in Chicago. In Chicago, Willie Earl storms out of the club when the manager refuses to listen to him audition. Ira then tells Bayou to take the stage and sing. Bayou becomes an unexpected hit at the Capital Royale club. 

Despite his success, Hattie Mae's juke joint is going under because the sheriff has threatened to arrest anyone who patronizes the spot. None of the whites in town will allow Hattie Mae to wash their clothes, so Hattie Mae is left tending a small garden just to get enough food. Bayou sends money, but the mail clerk opens all of Hattie's mail and steals the money before she can get it. Willie Earl's drug use catches up with him and he gets fired from the Capitol Royale Club. Enraged by the loss of his job, he blames Bayou for everything wrong in his life, his father's leaving, his failed music career, and his drug use. Bayou is unable to forget Leanne. Under the guise of returning for a one night show to help revive his mother's juke joint, Bayou makes his way back to Georgia. Willie Earl, jealous of his brother's success, tips off Sheriff Jackson that Bayou is back in town. Bayou sends word to Leanne, who now has a son, through Citsy that he is coming for her and this her chance to run away to Chicago. Bayou is reunited with Leanne, but due to Willie Earl's tip off, a mob lynches Bayou to the distress of Leanne and Bayou's family.

Jonathan, who is Leanne's son, is stunned after reading the letters and concludes that he is really Bayou's son and Hattie Mae's grandson. Jonathan visits his mother and hands over the letters Bayou had intended to send to her, moving her to tears. He then goes outside and is left to reckon with the truth of his birth and his heritage as fair–skinned black man.

Cast
 Joshua Boone as Bayou
 Amirah Vann as Hattie Mae
 Daphne Maxwell Reid as Elderly Hattie Mae
 Solea Pfeiffer as Leanne
 Waltrudis Buck as Elderly Leanne
 Austin Scott as Willie Earl
 Ryan Eggold as Ira
 Brent Antonello as John
 Brad Benedict as Sheriff Jackson
 Milauna Jemai Jackson as Citsy
 Lana Young as Ethel
 E. Roger Mitchell as Buster
 Kario Marcel as Johnathan
 Corey Champagne as LeRoy

Production
Tyler Perry wrote the screenplay, his first, in 1995. Lionsgate acquired the rights to the film in November 2006, with plans to begin production the following summer. In April 2008, it was slated to be Perry's next film following The Family That Preys (2008) with a tentative release in 2009. During a press junket for Madea Goes to Jail (2009), Perry expressed he had wanted to cast Diana Ross for a role but she had yet to respond. Perry explained, "I want her in the film. I've been sending flowers. I've been sending people by her. I've been sending emails to people who know her. I've talked to the man who walks her dog. I've been trying to locate where she's at." Perry continually delayed production on the film in hopes she would "say yes ...I just wish she would do it." The role, in particular, was that of a jazz singer who runs a juke joint. By December 2013, Perry admitted he had "given up" on casting Ross in the film.

On March 23, 2021, it was announced that Perry would direct the film A Jazzman's Blues for Netflix, with Joshua Boone and Solea Pfeiffer on board to star. On May 7, 2021, Brent Antonello, Brad Benedict, Ryan Eggold, Milauna Jemai Jackson, Kario Marcel, Austin Scott, Amirah Vann and Lana Young joined the cast of the film.

Principal photography began on May 5, 2021, and concluded on June 2. Filming took place in Savannah, Georgia, and at Tyler Perry Studios in Atlanta. The film's score was composed by Aaron Zigman, who scored several of Perry's previous films.

Release
The film premiered at the Toronto International Film Festival on September 11, 2022, and was released on Netflix on September 23, 2022.

Reception
 On Metacritic, the film has a weighted average score of 62 out of 100 based on 13 critics, indicating "generally favorable reviews." It is Perry's most acclaimed film to date.

Accolades

References

External links
 

2022 films
2022 drama films
2020s American films
2020s English-language films
American drama films
African-American films
English-language Netflix original films
Incest in film
Films directed by Tyler Perry
Films scored by Aaron Zigman
Films shot in Atlanta
Films shot in Savannah, Georgia
Films with screenplays by Tyler Perry